The William Ross Rust House is a house in Tacoma, Washington, United States, built in 1905 for William Ross Rust, then President of the Tacoma Smelter and Refining Company. The house was designed by Ambrose J. Russell, who worked for Russell & Babcock with Everett Phipps Babcock, and was built by Charles Miller. Russell & Babcock also designed the Washington Governor's Mansion.

It was built of sandstone from the Wilkeson sandstone quarry in Wilkeson, Washington. The building has a green, glazed terra cotta tile roof, 18 rooms, 4 baths, and 8 fireplaces. It was modeled after the John A. McCall Mansion in Monmouth County, New Jersey (built in 1903, destroyed by fire in 1927). It was added to the National Register of Historic Places on August 23, 1985.

References

External links

 Biography of William Ross Rust (History Link)
 List of National Register of Historic Places in Tacoma - Landmarks Preservation Commission, Tacoma Economic Development Department (Dead link 2020-Aug-19)
Rust Mansion I (Dead link 2017-Jan-13)
Rust Mansion II (Dead link 2017-Jan-13)

Buildings and structures in Tacoma, Washington
Houses in Pierce County, Washington
Houses on the National Register of Historic Places in Washington (state)
National Register of Historic Places in Tacoma, Washington